"Half Crazy" is a song performed by Johnny Gill. It is the opening track on his second studio album Chemistry and was issued as the album's lead single. Released in 1984, the single peaked at #26 on the Billboard R&B chart in 1985.

Chart positions

References

External links
 
 

1984 singles
Cotillion Records singles
Johnny Gill songs
Song recordings produced by Linda Creed
Songs written by Linda Creed
Songs written by Lonnie Jordan
1984 songs
Contemporary R&B ballads